Brad Williamson (born July 4, 1977) is a Canadian retired professional ice hockey defenceman.

Awards and honors

References

External links

1977 births
Living people
Canadian ice hockey defencemen
Ice hockey people from Ontario
Sportspeople from Thunder Bay
Thunder Bay Flyers players
North Dakota Fighting Hawks men's ice hockey players
Cincinnati Cyclones (IHL) players
Houston Aeros (1994–2013) players
South Carolina Stingrays players
Rochester Americans players
Colorado Eagles players
NCAA men's ice hockey national champions
AHCA Division I men's ice hockey All-Americans